Sundbyøster is one of the 15 administrative, statistical, and tax city districts (bydele) comprising the municipality of Copenhagen, Denmark.  It lies on the southeast border of the municipality on the island of Amager.  It covers an area of 8.60 km2, has a population of 48,673 and a population density of 5,658 per km2, which makes it the most populated district in Copenhagen.

Neighboring city districts are as follows:
 to the northwest is Christianshavn, separated from Syndbyøster by Stadsgraven (the city moat)
 to the west is Sundbyvester 
 to the south is Tårnby municipality, which is outside the Copenhagen municipality area
 to the east is the Øresund, the strait which separates the island of Zealand from Sweden

External links 
 City of Copenhagen’s statistical office

Copenhagen city districts